Fill Your Boots is the second full-length album by the English punk band Leatherface.

Critical reception
Trouser Press deemed the album both "dispensable" and "fine," writing that it added "nothing especially exciting to the genre." The Encyclopedia of Popular Music wrote that "fast and abrasive tracks ... demonstrated [Leatherface's] grip of hardcore dynamics and pop sensibilities."

Track listing 
 "New York State" - 3:53
 "Razorblades and Aspirin" - 2:30 
 "Speak in Tongues" - 3:19
 "Fate" - 3:02
 "Peasant in Paradise" - 3:12
 "The Bastards Can't Dance" - 3:53
 "Our Father" - 3:14
 "Leatherface" - 2:50
 "All I Wanted" - 3:04
 "Here Comes the Judge" - 4:54
 "In the Ghetto" - 2:54
 "Candle in the Wind" - 2:13

References

Leatherface (band) albums
1990 albums